Chaimite may refer to:

Chaimite, Mozambique, a village in Mozambique
Bravia Chaimite, a Portuguese armoured vehicle